Neighborhood Food Drive is a 2017 American comedy film directed by Jerzy Rose, starring Lyra Hill, Bruce Bundy, Marcos Barnes, Ruby McCollister and Ted Tremper.

Cast
 Lyra Hill as Madeline Bruhnhauer
 Bruce Bundy as Naomi Florida
 Marcos Barnes as Steven Highes
 Ruby McCollister as Bianca Pentecost
 Ted Tremper as David Bike
 Rhoda Griffis as Dean Manlowe
 Chris Sullivan as Naomi's Dad

Release
The film premiered at the Slamdance Film Festival on 20 January 2017.

Reception
Nick Perry of Boston Hassle called the film a "pertinent social commentary full of genuine hilarity and frank shock".

Ernesto Zelaya Miñano of ScreenAnarchy wrote that Rose "fully commits to his absurdist, black comedy tone" which "works wonders", and called the film a "refreshing change of pace from mainstream comedies and their seemingly mandatory gooey, feel-good moments."

J. R. Jones of the Chicago Reader wrote that under Rose’s direction "any laughs inherent in the premise are smothered by the defensively smug tone".

References

External links
 
 

American comedy films
2017 comedy films